Neda Spasojević (16 April 1941 – 16 July 1981) was a Serbian film, television and theater actress. She appeared in more than sixty films from 1964 until her 1981 death from cancer at age 40.

Early life
Neda Spasojević was born in the Yugoslav capital city Belgrade the week that the Kingdom of Yugoslavia was invaded by Germany in April 1941. Her father Milorad was a traveling actor. Her mother was an Austrian woman from Vienna named Hilda Lermer, who later adopted the Serbian name Jelena. Hilda worked as a seamstress for various theaters.

Career
Listening to her fathers advice to travel to Podgorica, Montenegro if she wished to become an actress, she performed in her first show on 23 March 1961. Spasojević appeared in her first film in 1964, acting alongside Danilo Stojković in Izdajnik.

Death
Spasojević was diagnosed with cancer in early 1981. She succumbed to the disease on 16 July 1981 at the age of 40, weeks after completing her scenes for the film Banović Strahinja. She was survived by her husband and eight year old  year-old daughter Isidora Minić.

Selected filmography

References

External links

1941 births
1981 deaths
Actresses from Belgrade
Golden Arena winners
Serbian film actresses